Drawiny  is a village in the administrative district of Gmina Drezdenko, within Strzelce-Drezdenko County, Lubusz Voivodeship, in western Poland. 

The village has a population of 470.

References

http://www.drawiny.xorg.pl

Drawiny